The Juan Antonio Samaranch Olympic Hall (Bosnian, Croatian and Serbian: Olimpijska dvorana Juan Antonio Samaranch / Олимпијска дворана Хуан Антонио Самаран; formerly Zetra Olympic Hall) is an indoor multi-purpose arena in Sarajevo, Bosnia and Herzegovina. Named in honor of Juan Antonio Samaranch in 2010 after his death, it was used for various sporting events at the 1984 Winter Olympics, and as the main venue of the 2019 European Youth Olympic Winter Festival.

History
The building of the complex started in June 1981 and was officially opened by then-President of the International Olympic Committee, Juan Antonio Samaranch, on February 14, 1982.

Olympic venue

Zetra Olympic Hall was constructed specifically for the 1984 Winter Olympics, hosted in Sarajevo, and was completed in 1982. Its first major event was the 1983 World Junior Speed Skating Championships. It was described as an "ultramodern, angular edifice" with a copper roof. The indoor venue hosted ice hockey and figure skating events, as well as the last closing ceremony held in an indoor place until Vancouver 2010.

From 1984 to 1991, Zetra remained in service as a venue for ice sports. It served as the venue for several international speed skating events, and several speed skating world records were broken here.

Destruction
The arena suffered substantial damage from shelling, bombing and fire by the Serb forces on Monday, May 25, 1992 during the Bosnian War. The interior of the structure, such as the basements and main hall, were put into service as a morgue, storage space for medication and supplies, and a staging area for UN equipment. The wooden seats from the venue were used as material for coffins for civilians killed in the war.

Reconstruction
After the war, it was discovered that though the building was badly damaged, the foundation was secure. Although the original blueprints were never recovered, in September 1997, reconstruction on the venue, facilitated by the SFOR, began. The International Olympic Committee donated $US 11.5 million to the project, which cost an estimated DM 32 million (€ 16.4 million). The reconstruction was completed in 1999.

Current use

Zetra hosted the Balkans Stability Pact Summit in July 1999. It is currently in service as a sporting arena. It is also used for music concerts, fairs and conferences. Sometimes, parts of the building are rented for other purposes (e.g. for the elections 2014, it was used as the Main Counting Center and election material storage space). The hall also contains a small museum about the 1984 Winter Olympics as well as a gym, billiard hall, bowling alley, pistol range, two cafes and other sports related content such as headquarters for various clubs and associations.

Concerts and other events

See also
 List of indoor arenas in Bosnia and Herzegovina

References

External links

World Stadiums

Venues of the 1984 Winter Olympics
Indoor arenas in Bosnia and Herzegovina
Indoor ice hockey venues in Bosnia and Herzegovina
Sports venues in Sarajevo
Grad Sarajevo
Olympic figure skating venues
Olympic ice hockey venues
Basketball venues in Bosnia and Herzegovina
Handball venues in Bosnia and Herzegovina
KK Bosna Royal
Sports venues completed in 1982
1982 establishments in Bosnia and Herzegovina